Yang Liwan (born 18 January 1978) is a Paralympian athlete from China competing mainly in category F54 throwing events.

Athletic career
Yang made her first appearance at a Summer Paralympics in the 2008 Games in Beijing. She entered both the shot put and javelin throw, finishing seventh and eighth respectively. Four years later she appeared at the 2012 Paralympics in London, winning gold in both the javelin and the shot put.

As well as her Paralympic success, Yang has also found success at World Championship level. At the 2015 IPC Athletics World Championships in Doha she won gold in the shot put along with a silver in the javelin.

Personal history
Yang was born in Shishi, China in 1978. In 1996 she was struck by a falling object resulting in paraplegia.

References

External links 
 

1978 births
Paralympic athletes of China
Athletes (track and field) at the 2008 Summer Paralympics
Athletes (track and field) at the 2012 Summer Paralympics
Athletes (track and field) at the 2020 Summer Paralympics
Paralympic gold medalists for China
Paralympic bronze medalists for China
Chinese female discus throwers
Chinese female shot putters
Chinese female javelin throwers
Living people
Medalists at the 2012 Summer Paralympics
Medalists at the 2016 Summer Paralympics
Medalists at the 2020 Summer Paralympics
People from Shishi, Fujian
Paralympic medalists in athletics (track and field)
Sportspeople from Quanzhou
Wheelchair discus throwers
Wheelchair shot putters
Wheelchair javelin throwers
Paralympic discus throwers
Paralympic shot putters
Paralympic javelin throwers
21st-century Chinese women